Alexander Nehamas (born 22 March 1946) is a Greek-born American philosopher. He is a professor of philosophy and comparative literature and the Edmund N. Carpenter II Class of 1943 Professor in the Humanities at Princeton University, where he has taught since 1990. He is a member of the American Academy of Arts & Sciences and Member of the American Philosophical Society (since 2016), the Academy of Athens since 2018. He works on Greek philosophy, aesthetics, Friedrich Nietzsche, Michel Foucault, and literary theory.

Biography 

Nehamas was born in Athens, Greece in 1946. In 1964, he enrolled to Swarthmore College. He graduated in 1967 and completed his doctorate (titled Predication and the Theory of Forms in the 'Phaedo''') under the direction of Gregory Vlastos at Princeton University in 1971. He taught at the University of Pittsburgh and the University of Pennsylvania before joining the Princeton faculty in 1990.

 Philosophical work 

His early work was on Platonic metaphysics and aesthetics as well as the philosophy of Socrates, but he gained a wider audience with his 1985 book Nietzsche: Life as Literature (Harvard University Press), in which he argued that Nietzsche thought of life and the world on the model of a literary text. Nehamas has said, "The virtues of life are comparable to the virtues of good writing—style, connectedness, grace, elegance—and also, we must not forget, sometimes getting it right." More recently, he has become well known for his view that philosophy should provide a form of life, as well as for his endorsement of the artistic value of television. This view also becomes evident in his book Only a Promise of Happiness. The title itself is later in this work used as one definition of beauty with reference to Stendhal. In that sense, beauty can be found in all media; as Nehamas claims in the same work: "Aesthetic features are everywhere, but that has nothing to do with where the arts can be found. Works of art can be beautiful because everything can be beautiful, but that doesn't mean that anything can be a work of art."

In 2016, Nehamas published a book, On Friendship, based on his 2008 Gifford Lectures. In it, he argues, contra Aristotle, that friendship is an aesthetic, but not always moral or good. In a manner similar to his earlier work, Only a Promise of Happiness, Nehamas compares the relationship of an individual to friends as having similarities to the relationship which an individual can have to artworks. “Like metaphors and works of art, the people who matter to us are all, so far as we are concerned, inexhaustible. They always remain a step beyond the furthest point our knowledge of them has reached—though only if, and as long as, they still matter to us.”

Selected works
 Nietzsche: Life as Literature, Cambridge: Harvard University Press (1985)
 Symposium (translation, with Paul Woodruff) (1989)
 The Art of Living: Socratic Reflections from Plato to Foucault (1998)
 Virtues of Authenticity: Essays on Plato and Socrates (1999)
 Only a Promise of Happiness: The Place of Beauty in a World of Art (2007)
 On Friendship'' (2016)

References

External links

 Nehamas' page at the Princeton department of philosophy
 List of articles (in Greek)
 "An Essay on Beauty and Judgment"
 Nehamas interviewed on Friendship for Philosophy Bites podcast
 Audio of Alexander Nehamas's lecture "Only in the Contemplation of Beauty Is Human Life Worth Living" at the Walter Chapin Simpson Center for the Humanities on Nov 17, 2005.
 Review of Nehamas' book Only A Promise of Happiness  in the New York Sun
 Art, Interpretation And The Rest Of Life
 The Gifford Lectures 2008
 Interview in Greek daily Kathimerini (February 13, 2011) on the occasion of Nehamas' award of an honorary doctoral degree at the School of Fine Arts of Athens University (in Greek)
 Audio of An interview with Alexander Nehamas on Beauty with Joshua Landy on February 15, 2011.

Living people
Greek emigrants to the United States
American scholars of ancient Greek philosophy
Philosophers of art
Swarthmore College alumni
Princeton University faculty
1946 births
Princeton University alumni
Members of the Academy of Athens (modern)
Presidents of the American Philosophical Association
Members of the American Philosophical Society